is a Japanese swimmer. She competed in the women's 50 metre freestyle event at the 2018 FINA World Swimming Championships (25 m), in Hangzhou, China.

References

External links
 

1994 births
Living people
Japanese female freestyle swimmers
Place of birth missing (living people)
Universiade medalists in swimming
Universiade silver medalists for Japan